Istrianis steganotricha is a moth of the family Gelechiidae. It is found in India and Indonesia (Java).

The larvae feed on Desmodium species.

References

Moths described in 1935
Istrianis